Rose City is an album by Viva Voce, released on May 26, 2009, on Barsuk Records.

Track listing (CD)
 "Devotion" 4:04	
 "Die A Little" 2:02	
 "Octavio" 4:31	
 "Midnight Sun" 4:14	
 "Red Letter Day" 3:50
 "Good As Gold" 3:19	
 "Rose City" 2:54	
 "Tornado Alley" 3:29	
 "Flora" 3:54	
 "The Slow Fade" 5:23

Track listing (vinyl)
 "Devotion" 4:04	
 "Die A Little" 2:02	
 "Octavio" 4:31	
 "Midnight Sun" 4:14	
 "Red Letter Day" 3:50
 "Hurdy Gurdy Man" 3:30
 "Good As Gold" 3:19	
 "Rose City" 2:54	
 "Tornado Alley" 3:29	
 "Flora" 3:54	
 "The Slow Fade" 5:23
 "Who Loves The Sun" 2:48

References

2009 albums
Viva Voce (band) albums
Barsuk Records albums